The Type 281 radar was a British naval early-warning radar developed during World War II. It replaced the Type 79 as the Royal Navy's main early-warning radar during the war.

The prototype system was mounted on the light cruiser  in October 1940. It required separate transmitting and receiving antennas that were rotated by hand. A second set was installed in January 1941 aboard the battleship  and production began of another 57 sets with the first deliveries occurring the following month. This set also had a secondary aerial and surface gunnery capability and used a Precision Ranging Panel. Aerial target ranges were passed directly to the HACS table (fire control computer).

Type 281B consolidated the transmission and receiving antennas while the Type 281BP radar had the short-pulse feature removed. The Type 281BQ was a Type 281BP fitted with power rotation, at 2 or 4 rpm, and equipped with a plan position indicator. After the end of the war, the Type 281 was replaced by the Type 960 radar.

Notes

Bibliography

External links
 The RN Radar and Communications Museum 

Type 279 radar
Naval radars
World War II radars
Royal Navy Radar